Jeffers is an unincorporated community and census-designated place (CDP) in Madison County, Montana, United States. It is in the eastern part of the county, on the east side of the valley of the Madison River.

Jeffers was first listed as a CDP prior to the 2020 census.

Demographics

References 

Census-designated places in Madison County, Montana
Census-designated places in Montana